Ibbagala Raja Maha Vihara (Sinhalaː ඉබ්බාගල රජ මහා විහාරය) is an ancient Cave temple in Kurunegala District, Sri Lanka. The temple is situated in middle of the Kurunegala town and lies in the mid valley area of the Ethagala Rock. The temple has been formally recognised by the Government as an archaeological site in Sri Lanka.

References

Buddhist temples in Kurunegala District
Buddhist caves in Sri Lanka
Archaeological protected monuments in Kurunegala District